Matrixx Magixx was a professional basketball team based in Nijmegen and later Wijchen. The club played in the Dutch Basketball League (DBL), the Dutch top-tier league. Home games of the Magixx were played in Sporthal De Arcus since 2012, therefore De Horstacker was used. The long time main sponsor of the team was The Matrixx. In 2014, Magixx departed from the DBL after the club could not find funding.

Founded as a new team from Nijmegen after the departure of Nijmegen, the club played in the DBL for nine straight seasons. Its biggest success was the NBB Cup championship in 2006–07, when Magixx beat Donar in the final. In the 2011–12 season, Magixx finished as runners-up in the DBL.

History

Magixx was founded after Eredivisie-team EiffelTowers Nijmegen left the city to merge with EBBC Den Bosch. Main reason was the small arena in Nijmegen, which didn't allow the club to play in European competitions. 

After the departure of the EiffelTowers in 2005, Matrixx Magixx was founded. Main sponsor was club The Matrixx, and the club stayed in the Horstacker. In the first season as Matrixx Magixx, the club won the national NBB Cup and reached the Dutch finals. In the Finals the team would lose to EiffelTowers Den Bosch, the club that adopted Eiffel as its new main sponsor. The following years the team would not reach further than the quarterfinals of the play-offs. 

In 2007 Magixx won the NBB Cup for the second time after defeating Donar in the final. In 2011 the team moved from Nijmegen to Wijchen, because the Horstacker didn't meet the requirements of the Magixx.

After the 2013–14 season, Magixx decided to leave the DBL. After long-time main sponsor The Matrixx ended its contract, Magixx did not have the financial means to sustain its professional team.

Honours
Dutch Basketball League 
Runners-up (1): 2006–07
Dutch Cups
Winners (1): 2006–07
Runners-up (1): 2011–12

Season by season

Players

Notable players

 Alhaji Mohammed (1 season: 2005–06)
 Ransford Brempong (2 seasons: 2005–07)
 Chris Copeland (2007–08)
 Thijs Vermeulen (7 seasons: 2007–14)
 Mickell Gladness (1 season: 2008–09)
 Torey Thomas (1 season: 2009–10)
 Markel Humphrey (3 seasons: 2009–12)
 Patrick Richard (1 season: 2013–14)
 Antoine Jordan <small>(2 seasons: 2007-09)

Individual award winners

All-DBL Team
Ryan Sears – 2007
Alhaji Mohammed – 2007
Ransford Brempong – 2007
Antoine Jordan – 2007
Tyler Smith – 2007
Markel Humphrey – 2012
Patrick Richard – 2014

References

External links
Official website

Defunct basketball teams in the Netherlands
Basketball teams established in 2005
Former Dutch Basketball League teams
Basketball teams disestablished in 2014
Sports clubs in Wijchen
Sports clubs in Nijmegen
History of Nijmegen